The Cook Islands are named after Captain James Cook, who visited the islands in 1773 and 1777, although Spanish navigator Alvaro de Mendaña was the first European to reach the islands in 1595. The Cook Islands became aligned to the United Kingdom in 1890, largely because of the fear of British residents that France might occupy the islands as it already had Tahiti.

By 1900, the islands were annexed as British territory. In 1901, the islands were included within the boundaries of the Colony of New Zealand.

The Cook Islands contain 15 islands in the group spread over a vast area in the South Pacific. The majority of islands are low coral atolls in the Northern Group, with Rarotonga, a volcanic island in the Southern Group, as the main administration and government centre. The main Cook Islands language is Rarotongan Māori. There are some variations in dialect in the 'outer' islands.

Early settlers of the Cooks 
It is thought that the Cook Islands may have been settled between the years 900-1200 CE. Early settlements suggest that the settlers migrated from Tahiti, to the northeast of the Cooks. The Cook Islands continue to hold important connections with Tahiti, and this is generally found in the two countries' culture, tradition and language. It is also thought that the early settlers were true Tahitians, who landed in Rarotonga (Takitumu district). There are notable historic epics of great warriors who travel between the two nations for a wide variety of reasons. The purpose of these missions is still unclear but recent research indicates that large to small groups often fled their island due to local wars being forced upon them. For each group to travel and to survive, they would normally rely on a warrior to lead them. Outstanding warriors are still mentioned in the countries' traditions and stories.

These arrivals are evidenced by an older road in Toi, the Ara Metua, which runs around most of Rarotonga, and is believed to be at least 1200 years old. This 29 km long, paved road is a considerable achievement of ancient engineering, possibly unsurpassed elsewhere in Polynesia. The islands of Manihiki and Rakahanga trace their origins to the arrival of Toa Nui, a warrior from the Puaikura tribe of Rarotonga, and Tepaeru, a high-ranking woman from the Takitumu or Te-Au-O-Tonga tribes of Rarotonga. Tongareva was settled by an ancestor from Rakahanga called Mahuta and an Aitutaki Ariki & Chief Taruia, and possibly a group from Tahiti. The remainder of the northern islands, Pukapuka (Te Ulu O Te Watu) was probably settled by expeditions from Samoa.

Early European contact
Spanish ships visited the islands in the 16th century; the first written record of contact between Europeans and the native inhabitants of the Cook Islands came with the sighting of Pukapuka by Spanish sailor Álvaro de Mendaña in 1595, who called it San Bernardo (Saint Bernard). Portuguese-Spaniard Pedro Fernández de Quirós made the first recorded European landing in the islands when he set foot on Rakahanga in 1606, calling it Gente Hermosa (Beautiful People).

British navigator Captain James Cook arrived in 1773 and 1777. Cook named the islands the 'Hervey Islands' to honour a British Lord of the Admiralty. Half a century later, the Russian Baltic German Admiral Adam Johann von Krusenstern published the Atlas de l'Ocean Pacifique, in which he renamed the islands the Cook Islands to honour Cook. Captain Cook navigated and mapped much of the group. Surprisingly, Cook never sighted the largest island, Rarotonga, and the only island that he personally set foot on was the tiny, uninhabited Palmerston Atoll.

The first recorded landing by Europeans was in 1814 by the Cumberland; trouble broke out between the sailors and the Islanders and many were killed on both sides.

The islands saw no more Europeans until missionaries arrived from England in 1821. Christianity quickly took hold in the culture and remains the predominant religion today.

In 1823, Captain John Dibbs of the colonial barque Endeavour made the first official sighting of the island Rarotonga. The Endeavour was transporting Rev. John Williams on a missionary voyage to the islands.

Brutal Peruvian slave traders, known as blackbirders, took a terrible toll on the islands of the Northern Group in 1862 and 1863. At first, the traders may have genuinely operated as labour recruiters, but they quickly turned to subterfuge and outright kidnapping to round up their human cargo. The Cook Islands was not the only island group visited by the traders, but Penrhyn Atoll was their first port of call and it has been estimated that three-quarters of the population was taken to Callao, Peru. Rakahanga and Pukapuka also suffered tremendous losses.

British protectorate

The Cook Islands became a British protectorate in 1888, due largely to community fears that France might occupy the territory as it had Tahiti. On 6 September 1900, the leading islanders presented a petition asking that the islands (including Niue "if possible") should be annexed as British territory. On 8–9 October 1900, seven instruments of cession of Rarotonga and other islands were signed by their chiefs and people, and a British proclamation issued at the same time accepted the cessions, the islands being declared parts of Her Britannic Majesty's dominions. These instruments did not include Aitutaki. It appears that, though the inhabitants regarded themselves as British subjects, the Crown's title was uncertain, and the island was formally annexed by Proclamation dated 9 October 1900. The islands were included within the boundaries of the Colony of New Zealand in 1901 by Order in Council under the Colonial Boundaries Act, 1895 of the United Kingdom. The boundary change became effective on 11 June 1901, and the Cook Islands have had a formal relationship with New Zealand since that time.

Recent history
In 1962 New Zealand asked the Cook Islands legislature to vote on four options for the future: independence, self-government, integration into New Zealand, or integration into a larger Polynesian federation. The legislature decided upon self-government. Following elections in 1965, the Cook Islands transitioned to become a self-governing territory in free association with New Zealand. This arrangement left the Cook Islands politically independent, but officially remaining under New Zealand sovereignty. This political transition was approved by the United Nations. Despite this status change, the islands remained financially dependent on New Zealand, and New Zealand believed that a failure of the free association agreement would lead to integration rather than full independence.

New Zealand is tasked with overseeing the country's foreign relations and defense. The Cook Islands, Niue, and New Zealand (with its territories: Tokelau and the Ross Dependency) make up the Realm of New Zealand.

After achieving autonomy in 1965, the Cook Islands elected Albert Henry of the Cook Islands Party as their first Prime Minister. He led the country until 1978 when he was accused of vote-rigging. He was succeeded by Tom Davis of the Democratic Party.

On 11 June 1980, the United States signed a treaty with the Cook Islands specifying the maritime border between the Cook Islands and American Samoa and also relinquishing the US claim to the islands of Penrhyn, Pukapuka, Manihiki, and Rakahanga. In 1990, the Cook Islands signed a treaty with France which delimited the maritime boundary between the Cook Islands and French Polynesia.

On June 13, 2008, a small majority of members of the House of Ariki attempted a coup, claiming to dissolve the elected government and to take control of the country's leadership. "Basically we are dissolving the leadership, the prime minister and the deputy prime minister and the ministers," chief Makea Vakatini Joseph Ariki explained. The Cook Islands Herald suggested that the ariki were attempting thereby to regain some of their traditional prestige or mana. Prime Minister Jim Marurai described the take-over move as "ill-founded and nonsensical". By June 23, the situation appeared to have normalised, with members of the House of Ariki accepting to return to their regular duties.

Gallery

Timeline

900  - first People arrive to the islands 

1595 — Spaniard Álvaro de Mendaña de Neira is the first European to sight the islands.

1606 — Portuguese-Spaniard Pedro Fernández de Quirós makes the first recorded European landing in the islands when he sets foot on Rakahanga.

1773 — Captain James Cook explores the islands and names them the Hervey Islands. Fifty years later they are renamed in his honour by Russian Admiral Adam Johann von Krusenstern.

1821 — English and Tahitian missionaries land in Aitutaki, become the first non-Polynesian settlers.

1823 — English missionary John Williams lands in Rarotonga, converting Makea Pori Ariki to Christianity.

1858 — The Cook Islands become united as a state, the Kingdom of Rarotonga.

1862 — Peruvian slave traders take a terrible toll on the islands of Penrhyn, Rakahanga and Pukapuka in 1862 and 1863.

1888 — Cook Islands are proclaimed a British protectorate and a single federal parliament is established.

1900 — The Cook Islands are ceded to the United Kingdom as British territory, except for Aitutaki which was annexed by the United Kingdom at the same time.

1901 — The boundaries of the Colony of New Zealand are extended by the United Kingdom to include the Cook Islands.

1924 — The All Black Invincibles stop in Rarotonga on their way to the United Kingdom and play a friendly match against a scratch Rarotongan team.

1946 — Legislative Council is established. For the first time since 1912, the territory has direct representation.

1957 — Legislative Council is reorganized as the Legislative Assembly.

1965 — The Cook Islands become a self-governing territory in free association with New Zealand. Albert Henry, leader of the Cook Islands Party, is elected as the territory's first prime minister.

1974 — Albert Henry is knighted by Queen Elizabeth II

1979 — Sir Albert Henry is found guilty of electoral fraud and stripped of his premiership and his knighthood. Tom Davis becomes Premier.

1980 — Cook Islands – United States Maritime Boundary Treaty establishes the Cook Islands – American Samoa boundary

1981 — Constitution is amended. Legislative Assembly is renamed Parliament, which grows from 22 to 24 seats, and the parliamentary term is extended from four to five years. Tom Davis is knighted.

1984 — The country's first coalition government, between Sir Thomas and Geoffrey Henry, is signed in the lead up to hosting regional Mini Games in 1985. Shifting coalitions saw ten years of political instability. At one stage, all but two MPs were in government.

1985 — Rarotonga Treaty is opened for signing in the Cook Islands, creating a nuclear-free zone in the South Pacific.

1986 — In January 1986, following the rift between New Zealand and the US in respect of the ANZUS security arrangements Prime Minister Tom Davis declared the Cook Islands a neutral country, because he considered that New Zealand (which has control over the islands' defence and foreign policy) was no longer in a position to defend the islands. The proclamation of neutrality meant that the Cook Islands would not enter into a military relationship with any foreign power, and, in particular, would prohibit visits by US warships. Visits by US naval vessels were allowed to resume by Henry's Government.

1990 — Cook Islands – France Maritime Delimitation Agreement establishes the Cook Islands–French Polynesia boundary

1991 — The Cook Islands signed a treaty of friendship and co-operation with France, covering economic development, trade and surveillance of the islands' EEZ. The establishment of closer relations with France was widely regarded as an expression of the Cook Islands' Government's dissatisfaction with existing arrangements with New Zealand which was no longer in a position to defend the Cook Islands.

1995 — The French Government resumed its programme of nuclear-weapons testing at Mururoa Atoll in September 1995 upsetting the Cook Islands. New Prime Minister Geoffrey Henry was fiercely critical of the decision and dispatched a vaka (traditional voyaging canoe) with a crew of Cook Islands' traditional warriors to protest near the test site. The tests were concluded in January 1996 and a moratorium was placed on future testing by the French government.

1997 — Full diplomatic relations established with the People's Republic of China.

1997 — In November, Cyclone Martin in Manihiki kills at least six people; 80% of buildings are damaged and the black pearl industry suffered severe losses.

1999 — A second era of political instability begins, starting with five different coalitions in less than nine months, and at least as many since then.

2000 — Full diplomatic relations concluded with France.

2002 — Prime Minister Terepai Maoate is ousted from government following second vote of no-confidence in his leadership.

2004 — Prime Minister Robert Woonton visits China; Chinese Premier Wen Jiabao grants $16 million in development aid.

2006 — Parliamentary elections held. The Democratic Party keeps majority of seats in parliament, but is unable to command a majority for confidence, forcing a coalition with breakaway MPs who left, then rejoined the "Demos".

2008 — Pacific Island nations imposed a series of measures aimed at halting overfishing.

See also

Cook Islands mythology
Postage stamps and postal history of the Cook Islands

References